Melissa Erin Chase is an American cryptographer known for her research on attribute-based encryption, digital credentials, and information privacy. She works at Microsoft Research.

Education
Chase graduated in 2003 from Harvey Mudd College, with a senior thesis in mathematics about the shortest path problem, advised by Ran Libeskind-Hadas.
She earned a Ph.D. from Brown University with Anna Lysyanskaya as her doctoral advisor.

Contributions
At Microsoft, Chase is one of the developers of Picnic, a digital signature scheme that Microsoft has submitted to the National Institute of Standards and Technology Post-Quantum Cryptography Standardization competition. Chase spoke about the project as an invited speaker at Real World Crypto 2018 in Zurich.

References

External links

Year of birth missing (living people)
Living people
American computer scientists
American cryptographers
Public-key cryptographers
Harvey Mudd College alumni
Brown University alumni
Women cryptographers